The 2022 Men's Sultana Bran Hockey One was the second season of Hockey Australia's national league, Hockey One. The tournament was held across 7 states and territories of Australia. Competition commenced on 29 September, and culminated with a finals weekend running from 19 to 20 November.

Unlike the previous edition where the top ranked women's team hosted the grand final, the grand final of the tournament will be held at a neutral venue in Bendigo.

Competition format

Format
The 2022 Hockey One season will follow same format as season one. Teams will play a series of home and away matches during the Pool Stage, which will be followed by a Classification Round.

During the pool stage, teams play each other once in either a home or a way fixture. The top four ranked teams will then qualify for the Classification Round, playing in two semi-finals with the winners contesting a grand final. Team 1 will host Team 4, while Team 2 will host Team 3. Of the two victorious teams, the higher ranked team from the pool stage will host the grand final.

Rules
In addition to FIH sanctioned rules, Hockey Australia is implementing the following rules for Hockey One:

 When a field goal or penalty stroke is scored the same athlete will have an automatic one-on-one shootout with the goalkeeper for an extra goal.
 Outright winner: There will be no drawn games. In the event of a draw, teams will contest a penalty shoot-out to determine a winner.

Point allocation
Match points will be distributed as follows:

 5 points: win
 3 points: shoot-out win
 2 points: shoot-out loss
 0 points: loss

Participating teams
The seven teams competing in the league come from Australia's states and territories, with the Northern Territory being the only team absent.

Head Coach: Hugh Purvis

Thomas Cleghorn
Connor Richmond-Spouse
Isaac Whittaker
Jye Clark (GK)
Jack Holland
Angus Fry
Geoff Abbott
Brodie Gleeson
Fred Gray
Cameron Joyce (C)
Mitchell Dell
Nathan Hochman
William Abbott
Zachary Rakkas
Alastair Oliver
Glyn Tamlin
Matthew Magann
Michael Doan
Christian Starkie (GK)
Cameron White

Head Coach: Darren Fowler

Shane Kenny
Corey Weyer
Hugh Pembroke
Luca Brown
Joshua Mynott
Joel Rintala
Adam Imer
Jacob Anderson
Jayden Atkinson
Michael Francis
Jacob Whetton (C)
Ethan White
Isaac Layton
Cale Cramer
Timothy Howard
Scott Boyde
Aaron Weiss (GK)
Daniel Beale
Jared Taylor
Mitchell Nicholson (GK)

Head Coach: Seyi Onitiri

Benjamin Staines
Anand Gupte
James Day
Connor Tuddenham
Benjamin Craig (C)
Sean Baker
Jamie Hawke
Owen Chivers
Garry Backhus
Jake Staines
Dylan Brick
Glenn Turner
Hayden Dillon
Oscar Smart
Aiden Dooley
Jeremy Hopkins
Jay MacDonald
Davis Atkin
Andrew Charter (GK)
Brendan Hill (GK)

Head Coach: Lachlan Anderson

Craig Marais
Max Hendry
Jonathan Bretherton
Liam Henderson
Douglas Buckley
Damon Steffens
Nathan Ephraums
Lachlan Steinfort
Trent Symss
Russell Ford (C)
Cooper Burns
Connar Otterbach
Jayshaan Randhawa
Eden Davis
Joshua Simmonds
Jed Snowden (GK)
Kiran Arunasalam
Johan Durst (GK)
Joshua Bretherton
Jake Sherren

Head Coach: Brent Livermore

Matthew Dawson (C)
Thomas Craig
Ashleigh Thomas (GK)
Daine Richards
Nathanael Stewart
Nathan Czinner
Robert MacLennan (GK)
Blake Govers
Dylan Martin
Miles Davis
Thomas Brown
Ky Willott
Flynn Ogilvie
Ryan Proctor
Jack Hayes
Ehren Hazell
Samuel Gray
Callum Mackay
Thomas Miotto
Rory Walker
Lachlan Sharp
Timothy Brand

Head Coach: David Guest

Christopher Bausor
William Battistessa
Timothy Geers
Jake Harvie
Bryn de Bes
James Collins
Tyler Lovell (GK)
Brodee Foster
Thomas Wickham
Thomas Harvie
Alistair Murray
Cambell Geddes
Liam Flynn
Aran Zalewski (C)
Harrison Golding
Benjamin Rennie (GK)
Sasha Thomas
Ross Hall
Benjamin Taylor
Matthew Willis

Head Coach: Stephen McMullen

Tyler McDonald
Hayden Beltz
Benjamin Austin
Joshua Brooks
Joshua Mardell
Joseph Murphy
Jeremy Edwards
Edward Ockenden
Samuel McCulloch
Joshua Beltz (C)
Jack Welch
Kieron Arthur
Timothy Deavin
James Bourke
Oliver Pritchard
Henry Chambers (GK)
Max Larkin (GK)
Oliver Smith
Gobindraj Gill
Jeremy Hayward

Venues

Results

Preliminary round
 Canberra Chill
|name_NSW =  NSW Pride
|name_BRI =  Brisbane Blaze
|name_ADL =  Adelaide Fire
|name_TAS =  Tassie Tigers
|name_MEL =  HC Melbourne
|name_PER =  Perth Thundersticks

|winpoints=5
|OTwinpoints=3
|OTlosspoints=2
|losspoints=0

|class_rules = 1) points; 2) matches won; 3) goal difference; 4) goals for; 5) head-to-head result; 6) field goals scored.

|res_col_header=Q
|col_Q=green1 |text_Q=Semi-finals
}}

Fixtures

|score   = 3–6
|team2   =  NSW Pride
|goals1  = Steffens Ephraums 
|report  = Report
|goals2  = Richards Willott Davis Martin 
|stadium = Melbourne Sports Centre, Melbourne
|umpires = Timothy Sheahan (AUS)Benjamin Hocking (AUS)
}}

|score   = 1–4
|team2   =  Brisbane Blaze
|goals1  = Ockenden 
|report  = Report
|goals2  = Rintala Cramer 
|stadium = Tasmanian Hockey Centre, Hobart
|umpires = Jayden Person (AUS)Stirling Sharpe (AUS)
}}

|score   = 5–2
|team2   =  Adelaide Fire
|goals1  = Zalewski Geddes Wickham 
|report  = Report
|goals2  = Fry 
|stadium = Perth Hockey Stadium, Perth
|umpires = Daniel Johnston (AUS)Nathan Jennings (AUS)
}}

|score   = 3–1
|team2   =  Canberra Chill
|goals1  = Rintala Cramer 
|report  = Report
|goals2  = B. Staines 
|stadium = Queensland State Hockey Centre, Brisbane
|umpires = Aaron Gotting (AUS)Stephen Rogers (AUS)
}}

|score   = 5–8
|team2   =  Perth Thundersticks
|goals1  = Ephraums Burns 
|report  = Report
|goals2  = Wickham Geddes Flynn 
|stadium = Melbourne Sports Centre, Melbourne
|umpires = James Unkles (AUS)Benjamin Hocking (AUS)
}}

|score   = 0–5
|team2   =  Tassie Tigers
|goals1  = 
|report  = Report
|goals2  = Brooks McCulloch Arthur Ockenden 
|stadium = MATE Stadium, Adelaide
|umpires = Jayden Pearson (AUS)Zeke Newman (AUS)
}}

|score   = 4–0
|team2   =  HC Melbourne
|goals1  = Day Dooley B. Staines 
|report  = Report
|goals2  = 
|stadium = National Hockey Centre, Canberra
|umpires = Stirling Sharpe (AUS) Zeke Newman (AUS)
}}

|score   = 3–4
|team2   =  NSW Pride
|goals1  = Tamlin Holland 
|report  = Report
|goals2  = Hazell Willott 
|stadium = MATE Stadium, Adelaide
|umpires =  James Unkles (AUS) Timothy Sheahan (AUS)
}}

|score   = 3–2
|team2   =  Brisbane Blaze
|goals1  = Flynn Battistessa 
|report  = Report
|goals2  = Cramer Rintala 
|stadium = Perth Hockey Stadium, Perth
|umpires = 
}}

|score   = 4–4
|team2   =  Canberra Chill
|goals1  = Welch Edwards 
|report  = Report
|goals2  = Day Atkin 
|stadium = Tasmanian Hockey Centre, Hobart
|umpires = Timothy Sheahan (AUS)Aaron Gotting (AUS)
|penaltyscore = 2–3
|penalties1 = J. Beltz Ockenden Welch H. Beltz Edwards 
|penalties2 =  Backhus J. Staines Atkin Day Dooley
}}

|score   = 4–3
|team2   =  Perth Thundersticks
|goals1  = Hazell Richards 
|report  = Report
|goals2  = Bausor J. Harvie Zalewski 
|stadium = Sydney Olympic Park, Sydney
|umpires = Zeke Newman (AUS)Benjamin Hocking (AUS)
}}

|score   = 4–0
|team2   =  HC Melbourne
|goals1  = Rintala Boyde Whetton 
|report  = Report
|goals2  = 
|stadium = Queensland State Hockey Centre, Brisbane
|umpires = Benjamin de Young (AUS)Stephen Rogers (AUS)
}}

|score   = 5–0
|team2   =  Adelaide Fire
|goals1  = B. Staines Day 
|report  = Report
|goals2  = 
|stadium = National Hockey Centre, Canberra
|umpires = Stirling Sharpe (AUS)James Unkles (AUS)
}}

|score   = 1–5
|team2   =  Brisbane Blaze
|goals1  = Davis 
|report  = Report
|goals2  = Cramer Rintala 
|stadium = Sydney Olympic Park, Sydney
|umpires = Zeke Newman (AUS)Aaron Gotting (AUS)
}}

|score   = 0–0
|team2   =  Tassie Tigers
|goals1  = 
|report  = Report
|goals2  = 
|stadium = Perth Hockey Stadium, Perth
|umpires = Daniel Johnstan (AUS) Nathan Jennings (AUS)
|penalties1= Wickham J. Harvie Collins Zalewski Bausor Wickham J. Harvie Collins Zalewski Bausor 
|penaltyscore=6–7
|penalties2= Welch Edwards Ockenden J. Beltz H. Beltz Welch J. Beltz Ockenden H. Beltz Edwards
}}

|score   = 1–9
|team2   =  HC Melbourne
|goals1  = Whittaker 
|report  = Report
|goals2  = Simmonds Copey Steffens Ephraums Jos. Bretherton 
|stadium = MATE Stadium, Adelaide
|umpires = Benjamin de Young (AUS)Zeke Newman (AUS)
}}

|score   = 2–1
|team2   =  NSW Pride
|goals1  = Hayward Welch 
|report  = Report
|goals2  = Willott 
|stadium = Tasmanian Hockey Centre, Hobart
|umpires = Jayden Pearson (AUS)Timothy Sheahan (AUS)
}}

|score   = 4–2
|team2   =  Perth Thundersticks
|goals1  = Day Dooley Hawke Backhus 
|report  = Report
|goals2  = Willis Wickham 
|stadium = National Hockey Centre, Canberra
|umpires = Stirling Sharpe (AUS)Stephen Rogers (AUS)
}}

|score   = 6–2
|team2   =  Tassie Tigers
|goals1  = Steffens Ephraums Simmonds C. Marais 
|report  = Report
|goals2  = Hayward 
|stadium = Melbourne Sports Centre, Melbourne
|umpires = James Unkles (AUS)Benjamin Hocking (AUS)
}}

|score   = 2–1
|team2   =  Adelaide Fire
|goals1  = Rintala Weyer 
|report  = Report
|goals2  = Holland 
|stadium = Queensland State Hockey Centre, Brisbane
|umpires = Benjamin de Young (AUS)Aaron Gotting (AUS)
}}

|score   = 0–3
|team2   =  Canberra Chill
|goals1  = 
|report  = Report
|goals2  = Day Dooley Hawke 
|stadium = McGlynn Sporting Complex, Parkes
|umpires = Neke Newman (AUS)Stirling Sharpe (AUS)
}}

Classification round
 Brisbane Blaze|1 (3)| NSW Pride (pen.)|1 (5)
|19 November 2022| Canberra Chill|3| Perth Thundersticks|6

|20 November 2022| NSW Pride|2| Perth Thundersticks|0

|20 November 2022| Brisbane Blaze|6| Canberra Chill|2

|RD1=Semi-finals |RD2=Grand Final |RD3=Third Place

|team-width=185|score-width=55|bold_winner=high
}}

Semi-finals

|score   = 1–1
|team2   =  NSW Pride
|goals1  = Howard 
|report  = Report
|goals2  = Dawson 
|stadium = Bendigo Regional Hockey Complex, Bendigo
|umpires = Daniel Johnston (AUS)Timothy Sheahan (AUS)
|penaltyscore = 3–5
|penalties1 = Anderson Cramer Weyer Beale 
|penalties2 =  Craig Hayes Willott Ogilvie Richards
}}

|score   = 3–6
|team2   =  Perth Thundersticks
|goals1  = Craig Dooley 
|report  = Report
|goals2  = Battistessa Foster Geddes Wickham 
|stadium = Bendigo Regional Hockey Complex, Bendigo
|umpires = Zeke Newman (AUS)James Unkles (AUS)
}}

Third and fourth place

|score   = 6–2
|team2   =  Canberra Chill
|goals1  = Rintala Francis Boyde Cramer 
|report  = Report
|goals2  = Day 
|stadium = Bendigo Regional Hockey Complex, Bendigo
|umpires = James Unkles (AUS)Benjamin Hocking (AUS)
}}

Final

|score   = 2–0
|team2   =  Perth Thundersticks
|goals1  = Willott 
|report  = Report
|goals2  = 
|stadium = Bendigo Regional Hockey Complex, Bendigo
|umpires = Zeke Newman (AUS)Daniel Johnston (AUS)
}}

Awards

Final standings
 Canberra Chill
|name_NSW =  NSW Pride
|name_BRI =  Brisbane Blaze
|name_ADL =  Adelaide Fire
|name_TAS =  Tassie Tigers
|name_MEL =  HC Melbourne
|name_PER =  Perth Thundersticks

|winpoints=5
|OTwinpoints=3
|OTlosspoints=2
|losspoints=0

|result1=1st |result2=2nd |result3=3rd |result4=4th |result5=GS |result6=GS |result7=GS
|pos_NSW= |pos_PER= |pos_BRI= |split4=yes

|res_col_header=Final standing
|text_1st=Gold Medal
|text_2nd=Silver Medal
|text_3rd=Bronze Medal
|text_4th=Fourth Place
|text_GS=Eliminated inGroup Stage
}}

Goalscorers
 Joel Rintala

|10 goals=
 Nathan Ephraums

|9 goals=
 Cale Cramer
 Thomas Wickham

|8 goals=
 James Day

|7 goals=
 Ky Willott

|6 goals=
 Benjamin Staines

|5 goals=
 Aiden Dooley

|4 goals=
 Ehren Hazell
 Daine Richards
 Jack Welch
 Joshua Simmonds
 Damon Steffens
 Liam Flynn
 Cambell Geddes
 Aran Zalewski

|3 goals=
 Jack Holland
 Jeremy Hayward

|2 goals=
 Davis Atkin
 Benjamin Craig
 Jamie Hawke
 Miles Davis
 Scott Boyde
 Jacob Whetton
 Angus Fry
 Joshua Brooks
 Edward Ockenden
 Nathan Copey
 William Battistessa

|1 goal=
 Garry Backhus
 Matthew Dawson
 Dylan Martin
 Michael Francis
 Timothy Howard
 Corey Weyer
 Glyn Tamlin
 Isaac Whittaker
 Kieron Arthur
 Jeremy Edwards
 Samuel McCulloch
 Cooper Burns
 Joshua Bretherton
 Craig Marais
 Christopher Bausor
 Brodee Foster
 Jake Harvie
 Matthew Willis
}}

References

External links
Hockey Australia
Hockey Australia Results Portal

2021
Hockey One